Retidrillia megalacme is a species of sea snail, a marine gastropod mollusk in the family Borsoniidae.

Description
The length of the shell attains 5 mm, its width 2.5 mm.

(Original description) The small shell has a conical-fusiform shape. The spire is well raised and fairly solid. Its colour (dead) is whitish-brown, with a white protoconch. It contains 6. turreted whorls, regularly increasing. The white protoconch is large. The first whorl and a half are smooth, then closely set longitudinal riblets are seen, and the whorl becomes carinate. The remaining whorls are acutely carinate, with an area below the suture, either smooth or with arcuate striae. Below the carina appear numerous longitudinal riblets, decussated by spiral carinations, giving the shell a somewhat prickly or nodulous appearance. The aperture is small, with a well-marked sinuation above. The columella is vertical, a little twisted at the base.

Distribution
This species occurs in the Atlantic Ocean off Portugal.

References

 Sykes E. R. 1906 On the Mollusca procured during the "Porcupine" Expeditions 1869–1870. Supplemental notes, part 3. Proceedings of the Malacological Society of London 7: 173–190.
 McLean J. H. (2000). Four new genera for northeastern Pacific gastropods. The Nautilus. 114: 99–102.

External links
  Bouchet P., Kantor Yu.I., Sysoev A. & Puillandre N. (2011) A new operational classification of the Conoidea. Journal of Molluscan Studies 77: 273–308.

megalacme
Gastropods described in 1906